In number theory, an equidigital number is a natural number in a given number base that has the same number of digits as the number of digits in its prime factorization in the given number base, including exponents but excluding exponents equal to 1. For example, in base 10, 1, 2, 3, 5, 7, and 10 (2 × 5) are equidigital numbers . All prime numbers are equidigital numbers in any base.

A number that is either equidigital or frugal is said to be economical.

Mathematical definition
Let  be the number base, and let  be the number of digits in a natural number  for base . A natural number  has the prime factorisation
 

Properties
Every prime number is equidigital. This also proves that there are infinitely many equidigital numbers.

See also
Extravagant number
Frugal number
Smith number

Notes

References 
R.G.E. Pinch (1998), Economical Numbers.

Integer sequences
Base-dependent integer sequences